is a Japanese actor probably best known outside Japan for his portrayal of Riki Fudoh in Fudoh: The New Generation.

Tanihara hosts Tokyo Twenty-Four Living Supported by FLET’S Hikari, a podcast produced by TOKYO FM. The podcast began airing on 2006-01-07 with a guest appearance by the former Yokohama Bay Stars pitcher Takashi Saitō.

Tanihara was born in Yokohama, Kanagawa Prefecture. He is married to Emi Miyake, who gave birth to their daughter in October 2007. He made the announcement at the 8th Best Formalist Award ceremony. He is now a father with six children.

Filmography

Films
 Hana Yori Dango (1995)
 Fudoh: The New Generation (1996)
 Godzilla vs. Megaguirus (2000)
 Pyrokinesis (2000)
 Sky High (2003)
 Godzilla: Final Wars (2004)
 Lovely Complex (2006)
 Memories of Matsuko (2006)
 Vexille (2007)
 The Magic Hour (2008)
 The Handsome Suit (2008)
 My Rainy Days (2009)
 Baby Baby Baby! (2009)
 Victini and the Black Hero: Zekrom and Victini and the White Hero: Reshiram (2011)
 Andalusia: Revenge of the Goddess (2011)
 Dokidoki! PreCure the Movie: Mana's Getting Married!!? The Dress of Hope Tied to the Future! (2013) – Marsh/Maro (voice)
 Birthday Card  (2016) – Himself
 Marmalade Boy (2018)
 Iwane: Sword of Serenity (2019)
Sources:

Television dramas
 Boku no Ikiru Michi (2003, Fuji TV)
 Shinsengumi! (2004, NHK) – Itō Kashitarō
 Ōoku (2005, Fuji TV), Tokugawa Tsunayoshi
 Gokusen 2 (2005, NTV) – Takuma Kujo, teacher at Momo Girls High School
 Fūrin Kazan (2007, NHK) – Imagawa Yoshimoto
 Watashitachi no Kyoukasho (2007)
 ‘’Love Shuffle’’(2009) - Kikuta Masato
 Ryōmaden (2010, NHK) – Katsura Kogorō
 Gunshi Kanbei (2014, NHK) – Takenaka Hanbei
 Smoking Gun (2014, Fuji TV)
Daddy Detective (2015, TBS) – Shintaro Sugiyama
 Hanbun, Aoi (2018, NHK)
 Godaime San'yūtei Enraku (2019, BS-NTV) – San'yūtei Enraku V
 Fujoshi, Ukkari Gay ni Kokuru (2019, NHK) - Makoto
 Ōoku the Final (2019, Fuji TV), Manabe Akifusa
 Kirin ga Kuru (2020, NHK), Mitsubuchi Fujihide
 Nakamura Nakazo: Shusse no Kizahashi (2021, NHK)

Variety shows
 Truth or Doubt (2004-2005, Host, TV Quiz Show)
 Panel Quiz Attack 25 (2015-2021, main presenter)

Video games
 Judge Eyes - Mitsuru Kuroiwa

Dubbing
 Mary Poppins Returns – Michael Banks (Ben Whishaw)

References

Japanese male television actors
Japanese male film actors
Japanese male stage actors
1972 births
Male actors from Yokohama
Living people
20th-century Japanese male actors
21st-century Japanese male actors